Iceland's first ambassador to Finland was Jakob Möller in 1947. Iceland's current ambassador to Finland is Árni Þór Sigurðsson.

List of ambassadors

See also
Finland–Iceland relations
Foreign relations of Iceland
Ambassadors of Iceland

References
List of Icelandic representatives (Icelandic Foreign Ministry website) 

1947 establishments
Main
Finland
Iceland